Alien invasion is a common theme in science fiction stories and film, in which extraterrestrial life invades Earth.

It may also refer to:
 Alien Invasion, an expansion for Anarchy Online
 "Alien Invasion", a Drake & Josh episode where Megan (Miranda Cosgrove) thinks there are aliens in space
 Alien Invasion (film), a 2004 short film to promote environmentalism
 Allien Invasion (Water ride) a ride at Splish Splash Water Park
 UFO: Alien Invasion, an open source game